Zomariana doxasticana is a species of moth of the family Tortricidae. It is found in Australia and sporadically in New Zealand. This species has not been recorded since 1999. It has been hypothesised that it is immigrant that sporadically establishes.

References

Olethreutini
Moths described in 1881
Moths of New Zealand
Moths of Australia
Taxa named by Edward Meyrick